Eliane Steinemann is a Swiss figure skater who competed in pair skating.

With partner André Calame, she won silver at the 1950 and 1951 European Figure Skating Championships.

Competitive highlights 
With  André Calame

References 

Swiss female pair skaters